1.8KS7800 is a solid propellant rocket engine designed by Aerojet and used in the AIM-7A, AIM7B and AIM7C Sparrow missiles. The designation 1.8KS7800 means that the engine burns during 1.8 seconds and generates 7,800 pounds of thrust.

References 

Rocket engines